NA-239 Karachi East-IV is a newly-created a constituency for the National Assembly of Pakistan. It mainly comprises the areas of Jamshed Quarters Subdivision, and Firozabad Subdivision that were previously in the western portion of the old NA-252.

Members of Parliament

2018-2023: NA-245 Karachi East-IV

Election 2018 

General elections were held on 25 July 2018.

By-election 2022 
A by-election was held on 21 August 2022 due to the death of Aamir Liaquat Hussain, the former MNA from this seat.

See also
NA-238 Karachi East-III
NA-240 Karachi South-I

References 

Karachi